"Hold On Loosely" is a song by American rock band 38 Special and the first track from their fourth studio album Wild-Eyed Southern Boys.

Release
Released as the lead single from the album, the song reached No. 3 on the Billboard Rock Tracks chart, and No. 27 on the Billboard Hot 100. It later appeared on their 1987 compilation album Flashback: The Best of 38 Special and their 1999 live album Live at Sturgis. It was the 13th music video to be played on the day that MTV debuted in 1981. Don Barnes sang lead vocals on the song.

Record World said that "Rip-roarin' guitars slash away at the dual-drum rhythm section while Don Barnes' convincing lead vocal handles the bold hook."

Origin
Barnes going through a difficult time in his marriage, lamented that his wife was not being more supportive of his career aspirations.  He presented a seed idea for a song to co-writer Jim Peterik, asking what he thought of the title "Hold On Loosely", to which Peterik came back with, "...but don't let go". For the music, Peterik described the song's opening riff as "Like the Cars meets Lynyrd Skynyrd or something". Taking inspiration from "Just What I Needed" by the Cars, Jeff Carlisi wrote the famous riff to the song.

In popular culture
It was used in Season 1, episode 6 of Better Call Saul and the comedy films Joe Dirt and Without a Paddle.

References

External links
 

38 Special (band) songs
1980 songs
1981 singles
A&M Records singles
Songs written by Jim Peterik
Songs written by Don Barnes
Song recordings produced by Rodney Mills